Marc David Polmans (born 2 May 1997) is a South African-born Australian tennis player. 
Polmans has a career high ATP singles ranking of World No. 116 achieved on 12 October 2020. He also has a career high ATP doubles ranking of World No. 68 achieved on 16 October 2017. He won the 2015 Australian Open boys' doubles title with fellow Australian Jake Delaney, defeating Hubert Hurkacz and Alex Molčan in the final. He reached the semifinal of the 2017 Australian Open doubles with Andrew Whittington.

Personal life
He supports Collingwood in the Australian Football League.

Career

2012–2015: Career beginnings
Polmans turned pro in 2012 and ended the year with a ranking of 1813. Over the next three years, Polmans played predominantly in the ITF Futures tour. Polmans won his first title with Steven de Waard at the Australia F9 Futures in 2014. The pair won five more future titles in 2015.

Polmans reached the second round of qualifying in the 2015 Australian Open where he defeated Jordi Samper-Montaña in the first round before losing to Tim Smyczek.

2016–2017: Ranking increase
Polmans commenced 2016 with a singles ranking of 841. He lost in the first round of qualifying for the 2016 Australian Open. 
In June 2016, Polmans won his first singles title in Mozambique F1. This was followed by another title the following week. Over the next 3 months, Polmans reached a further 6 finals, winning 2 including one in Alice Springs. In November, Polmans reached his first ATP Challenger Tour final in Canberra. He lost to compatriot James Duckworth in straight sets. He ended 2016 with a ranking of No. 226.

Polmans commenced 2017 at the Happy Valley Challenger where he lost in round 1. Polmans lost in round 1 of 2017 Australian Open – Men's singles qualifying. In the doubles, Polmans paired with Andrew Whittington where they reached the semi-final. Polmans made the 2nd round of the 2017 French Open – Men's singles qualifying. Polmans received a wildcard entry to the 2017 Croatia Open, marking his first singles main draw appearance on the ATP World Tour. He faced Alessandro Giannessi but lost in round 1. In July, Polmans made the main draw of the Citi Open in Washington as a lucky loser, losing to Jared Donaldson. Polmans ended the year on the Challenger circuit with his best result being a semi-final appearance at Canberra. Polmans ended 2017 with a singles ranking of No. 323 and doubles ranking of No. 70.

2018: First challenger title
In February, Polmans won his maiden challenger title at the 2018 Launceston Tennis International. In April he lost to Noah Rubin of the US in the finals of the 2018 Tallahassee Tennis Challenger in Florida. In May and June, Polmans lost in the first round of French Open qualifying and Wimbledon qualifying. He continued to play across the Challenger tour of Europe. In August, Polmans lost in the final round of qualifying for the US Open. In October, Polmans partnered Jeremy Beale to win his first doubles challenger title at Traralgon.

2019: Major debut at Australian Open, Challenger title, first ATP win
Polmans was awarded a wildcard into the 2019 Australian Open. He lost in the first round to USA's Denis Kudla 5–7, 1–6, 6–2, 6–3, 6–2.

In March, Polmans won his second ATP Challenger title when he defeated Italy's Lorenzo Giustino 6–4, 4–6, 7–6(4)

In July, Polman qualified for the main draw of the Washington Open. Polmans defeated Malek Jaziri for his first main draw win on the ATP Tour.

In August, Polmans lost in the first round of 2019 US Open – Men's singles qualifying.

2020: First two Major wins, US and French Open debut
In January participating again as a wildcard, Polman won his first main draw singles match at the Australian Open over Mikhail Kukushkin. Polmans also won his first French Open match as a lucky loser against Ugo Humbert. Having reached a career-high singles ranking of World No. 116 on 12 October 2020, Polmans ended 2020 with a singles ranking of World No. 124 and a doubles ranking of World No. 130.

2021: Australian Open semifinal mixed doubles, Wimbledon debut
For the third year in a row being awarded a wildcard, he lost in the first round of the Australian Open to Marton Fucsovics but he made the semifinals of the 2021 Australian Open – Mixed doubles with Storm Sanders.

He qualified for the first time for a Grand Slam in his career into the main singles draw of the 2021 Wimbledon Championships. Polmans defeated former quarter-finalist Yen-Hsun Lu in the first round. Polmans lost to 19th seed Cristian Garín in round two.

In July, Polmans reached the quarterfinal at the Kitzbühel Open in doubles partnering Pedro Martinez. Polmans ended 2021 with a singles ranking of World No. 196 and a doubles ranking of World No. 103.

2022: Hiatus, substantial rankings drop, back to Challenger tour 
Polmans lost in the second round of the 2022 Australian Open men's singles qualifying.

He lost in the first round of qualifying at the US Open.

He won his seventh doubles Challenger title in Korea with Max Purcell and returned to the top 300 in doubles jumping up 345 places to world No. 297 on 24 October 2022.

Coaching
Since July 2019, Polmans has been coached by Marcel du Coudray, former coach of world number 3 Nikolay Davydenko. Polmans was coached by former Top 100 player, Peter Luczak, at the Tennis Australia National Academy in Melbourne.

Performance timelines

Singles
Current after the 2022 Australian Open

Challenger and Futures finals

Singles: 23 (12–11)

Doubles: 28 (20–8)

Junior Grand Slam finals

Doubles: 1 (1 title)

References

External links
 Official website
 
 
 

1997 births
Living people
Australian male tennis players
Sportspeople from Durban
People from Melbourne
Tennis people from Victoria (Australia)
Australian Open (tennis) junior champions
Tennis players at the 2014 Summer Youth Olympics
Grand Slam (tennis) champions in boys' doubles